Michael R. Krätke (born 1950) was professor for political economy at Lancaster University, and editor of the German scholarly journal .

Krätke has been working on the history of Marxism since the 1990s Among other things, he has developed a periodization of Marxist intellectual history and identified four stages: (1) from 1842 until Marx’ death in 1883, (2) "classical marxism" from 1883 until World War I, (3) the third stage from the Russian Revolution into the 1960s, (4) the last stage of a social-scientific Marxism following the Marx-Renaissance of the 1960s. He is a member of the scientific advisory council to the German chapter of attac.

Writings

Selected works

Articles 
 Das Marx-Engels-Problem. Warum Engels das Marxsche „Kapital“ nicht verfälscht hat (Why Engels did not falsify Marx's Capital) In: Marx-Engels-Jahrbuch 2006, Berlin 2007, S. 142–170.
 Die Mythen der Globalisierung (The Myth of Globalization). In: Zeitschrift Marxistische Erneuerung, December 2002.

References

External links 
 website of Michael Krätke at Lancaster University
 

Living people
German political scientists
1950 births